Donaldson Mountain is a mountain located in Franklin County, New York, named in 1924 after Alfred Lee Donaldson (1866–1923), author of A History of the Adirondacks. 
The mountain is part of the Seward Mountains of the Adirondacks.
Donaldson Mtn. is flanked to the northeast by Seward Mountain, and to the south by Mount Emmons.

Donaldson Mountain stands within the watershed of the Raquette River, which drains into the Saint Lawrence River in Canada, and into the Gulf of Saint Lawrence.
The southeast side of Donaldson Mt. drains into Seward Brook, thence into the Cold River, a tributary of the Raquette River.
The southwest end of Donaldson Mt. drains into Boulder Brook, thence into the Cold River.
The northwest side of Donaldson drains into Calkins Brook, thence into the Raquette River.

Donaldson Mountain is within the High Peaks Wilderness Area of Adirondack State Park.

See also 
 List of mountains in New York
 Northeast 111 4,000-footers 
 Adirondack High Peaks
 Adirondack Forty-Sixers

Notes

External links 
 

Mountains of Franklin County, New York
Adirondack High Peaks
Mountains of New York (state)